The Ewe people (lit. "Ewe people"; or Mono Kple Volta Tɔ́sisiwo Dome, lit. "Ewe nation","Eʋenyigba" Eweland;) are a Gbe-speaking ethnic group. The largest population of Ewe people is in Ghana (6.0 million), and the second largest population is in Togo (3.1 million). They speak the Ewe language which belongs to the Gbe family of languages. They are related to other speakers of Gbe languages such as the Fon, Gen, Phla Phera, Gun, Maxi, and the Aja people of Togo, Benin and southwestern Nigeria.

Demographics

Ewe people are located primarily in the coastal regions of West Africa: in the region south and east of the Volta River to around the Mono River at the border of Togo and Benin; and in the southwestern part of Nigeria (close to the Atlantic Ocean, stretching from the Nigeria and Benin border to Epe). They are primarily found in the Volta Region in southeastern Ghana, southern Togo, in the southwestern part of Benin, and a small population in the southwestern region of Nigeria (most of whom are settled in Badagry). The Ewe region is sometimes referred to as the Ewe nation or Eʋedukɔ́ region (Togoland in colonial literature).

They consist of several groups based on their dialect and geographic concentration: the Anlo Ewe, Ʋedome (Danyi), Tongu or Tɔŋu. The literary language has been the Anlo sub-branch.

History
The Ewe people were formerly known as the Dogbo. 
The ancient history of the Ewe people is not recorded. they might have migrated from a place called Ketu or Amedzofe in Benin, east of the Niger River, or that they are from the region that is now the border between Benin and Nigeria and then, because of invasions and wars in the 17th century, migrated into their current location. Archaeological evidence suggests that the Ewe people likely had some presence in their current homelands at least as early as the 13th century. This evidence dates their dynamism to a much earlier period than previously believed. However, other evidence also suggests a period of turmoil, particularly when Yoruba warriors of the Oyo Empire ruled the region. Their own oral tradition describes the brutal king Agɔ Akɔli or (Agor Akorli) of Notsie (a formerly walled town in Togo) ruled in the 17th century. The highhandedness of King Agor Akorli culminated in the escape and dispersal of the Ewe to their present locations.

They share a history with people who speak Gbe languages. These speakers occupied the area between Akan land and Yorubaland. Previously, some historians have tried to tie them to both Akan and Yoruba ethnic groups, but more recent studies suggest these are distinct ethnic groups that are neither Akan nor Yoruba, although they appear to have both influenced and taken influence from the two ethnic groups.

The Ewe people had cordial relations with pre-slave trade and pre-colonial era Europeans. However, in 1784, they warred with Danish colonial interests as Denmark attempted to establish coastal forts in the Ewe and Yoruba regions for its officials and merchants. Nestled between powerful slave-trading kingdoms like the Asante, Dahomey and Oyo, the Ewes were both victims of slave raiding and trade, as well as sold their war captives to the Europeans.
After slavery was abolished and slave trade brought to a halt, the Ewes flourished in their major economic activities of Cotton and rice farming, palm oil and copra production and exports. Their region was divided between the colonial powers, initially between the German and British colonies, and after World War I, their territories were divided between the British and a British-French joint protectorate. After World War I, the British Togoland and French Togoland were respectively renamed Trans Volta Togoland and Togo. Trans Volta Togoland voted in  United Nations supervised plebiscite to join the newly independent Ghana. French Togoland was renamed Republic of Togo and gained independence from France on April 27, 1960.

There have been efforts to consolidate the Ewe peoples into one unified country since the colonial period, with many post-colonial leaders occasionally supporting their cause, but none have ultimately been successful.

Religion

Traditional religion
The sophisticated theology of the Ewe people is similar to those of nearby ethnic groups, such as the Fon religion. This traditional Ewe religion is called Vodun. The word is borrowed from the Fon language, and means "spirit". The Ewe religion holds Mawu as the creator God, who created numerous lesser deities (trɔwo) that serve as the spiritual vehicles and the powers that influence a person's destiny. This mirrors the Mawu and Lisa (Goddess and God) theology of the Fon religion, and like them, these are remote from daily affairs of the Ewe people. The lesser deities are believed to have means to grant favors or inflict harm.

The Ewe have the concept of Si, which implies a "spiritual marriage" between the deity and the faithful. It is typically referred to as a suffix to a deity. Thus a Fofie-si refers to a faithful who has pledged to deity Fofie, just like a spouse would during a marriage. Ancestral spirits are important part of the Ewe traditional religion, and shared by a clan.

Christianity
Christianity arrived among the Ewe people with the colonial merchants and missionaries. Major missions were established after 1840, by European colonies. German Lutheran missionaries arrived in 1847. Their ideas were accepted in the coastal areas, and Germans named their region Togoland, or Togo meaning 'beyond the sea' in Ewe language. Germans lost their influence in World War I, their Christian missions were forced to leave the Togoland, and thereafter the French and British missionaries became more prominent among the Ewe people.

About 89% of the Ewe population, particularly belonging to the coastal urban area, has converted to Christianity. However, they continue to practice the traditional rites and rituals of their ancestral religion.

Society and culture

The Ewe people are a patrilineal people who live in towns, cities and villages that contain lineages. Each lineage is headed by the male elder. The male ancestors have Ewe are revered, and traditionally, families can trace male ancestors. The land owned by an Ewe family is considered an ancestral gift, and they do not sell this gift anyhow.

Ewe people are notable for their fierce independence, and they have supported a decentralization of power within a village or through a large state. Decisions have been made by a collection of elders, and they have refused to politically support wicked kings or leaders, after their experience with the 17th century powerful despot named Agokoli. Despite all their internal conflicts, they come together in times of war and external conflicts. In regional matters, the chief traditional priest has been the primary power. In contemporary times, the Ewes have attempted to connect and build a common culture and language-driven identity across the three countries where they are commonly found.

While patrilineal, the Ewe women are traditionally the major merchants and traders, both at wholesale and retail level. "They deal in a wide variety of items, many of which are produced by men."

Another notable aspect of Ewe culture, state ethnologists such as Rosenthal and Venkatachalam, is their refusal to blame others, their "deep distress and voluntary acceptance of guilt" for their ancestor's role in the slave trade. They have gone to extraordinary lengths to commemorate former slaves midst them, and making the ancestors of the slaves to be revered deities as well.

Music

The Ewes have developed a complex culture of music, closely integrated with their traditional religion. This includes drumming. Ewes believe that if someone is a good drummer, it is because they inherited a spirit of an ancestor who was a good drummer.

Ewe music has many genres. One is Agbekor, which relates to songs and music around war. These cover the range of human emotions associated with the consequence of war, from courage and solidarity inspired by their ancestors, to the invincible success that awaits Ewe warriors, to death and grief of loss.

Cross-rhythm drumming is a part of Ewe musical culture. In general, Ewe drums are constructed like barrels with wooden staves and metal rings, or carved from a single log. They are played with sticks and hands, and often fulfill roles that are traditional to the family. The 'child' or 'baby brother' drum, kagan, usually plays on the off beats in a repeated pattern that links directly with the bell and shaker ostinatos. The 'mother' drum, kidi, usually has a more active role in the accompaniment. It responds to the larger sogo or 'father' drum. The entire ensemble is led by the atsimevu or 'grandfather' drum, largest of the group.

Lyrical songs are more prevalent in the southern region. In the north, flutes and drums generally take the place of the singer's voice.

Dance

The Ewe have an intricate collection of dances, which vary between geographical regions and other factors. One such dance is the Adevu (Ade - hunting, Vu - dance). This is a professional dance that celebrates the hunter. They are meant both to make animals easier to hunt and to give animals a ritual "funeral" in order to prevent the animal's spirit from returning and harming the hunter.

Another dance, the Agbadza, is traditionally a war dance but is now used in social and recreational situations to celebrate peace. War dances are sometimes used as military training exercises, with signals from the lead drum ordering the warriors to move ahead, to the right, go down, etc. These dances also helped in preparing the warriors for battle and upon their return from fighting they would act out their deeds in battle through their movements in the dance.

The Atsiagbekor is a contemporary version of the Ewe war dance Atamga (Great (ga) Oath (atama) in reference to the oaths taken by people before proceeding into battle. The movements of this present-day version are mostly in platoon formation and are not only used to display battle tactics, but also to energize and invigorate the soldiers. Today, Atsiagbekor is performed for entertainment at social gatherings and at cultural presentations.

The Atsia dance, which is performed mostly by women, is a series of stylistic movements dictated to dancers by the lead drummer. Each dance movement has its own prescribed rhythmic pattern, which is synchronized with the lead drum. "Atsia" in the Ewe language means style or display.

The Bobobo (originally "Akpese") is said to have been developed by Francis Kojo Nuatro. He is thought to have been an ex-police officer who organized a group in the middle to late 1940s. The dance has its roots from Wusuta and in the Highlife music popular across West African countries. Bobobo gained national recognition in the 1950s and 1960s because of its use at political rallies and the novelty of its dance formations and movements. It is generally performed at funerals and other social occasions. This is a social dance with a great deal of room for free expression. In general, the men sing and dance in the center while the women dance in a ring around them. There are "slow" and "fast" versions of Bobobo. The slow one is called Akpese and the fast one is termed to be Bobobo.

Agahu is both the name of a dance and of one of the many secular music associations (clubs) of the Ewe people of Togo, Dahomey, and in the south-eastern part of the Volta Region. Each club (Gadzok, Takada, and Atsiagbeko are other such clubs) has its own distinctive drumming and dancing, as well as its own repertoire of songs. A popular social dance of West Africa, Agahu was created by the Egun speaking people from the town of Ketonu in what is now Benin. From there it spread to the Badagry area of Nigeria, where Ewe Settlement mostly fisherman heard, adapted. In dancing the Agahu, two circles are formed; the men stay stationary with their arms out and then bend with a knee forward for the women to sit on. They progress around the circle until they arrive at their original partner.

Gbedzimido is a war dance mostly performed by the people of Mafi-Gborkofe and Amegakope in the Central Tongu district of Ghana's Volta Region. Gbedzimido has been transformed into a contemporary dance and is usually seen only on very important occasions like the Asafotu festival, celebrated annually by the Tongu people around December. The dance is also performed at the funerals of highly placed people in society, mostly men. Mafi-Gborkofe is a small farming village near Mafi-Kumase.

Gota uses the mystical calabash drum of Benin, West Africa. The calabash was originally called the "drum of the dead" and was played only at funerals. It is now performed for social entertainment. The most exciting parts of Gota are the synchronized stops of the drummers and dancers.

Tro-u is ancestral drum music that is played to invite ancestors to special sacred occasions at a shrine. For religious purposes, a priest or priestess would be present. There are fast and slow rhythms that can be called by the religious leader in order to facilitate communication with the spirit world. The bell rhythm is played on a boat-shaped bell in the north, but the southern region uses a double bell. The three drums must have distinct pitch levels in order to lock in.

Sowu is one of the seven different styles of drumming that belong to the cult of Yewe, adapted for stage. Yewe is the God of Thunder and lightning among the Ewe speaking people of Togo, Benin, and in south-eastern parts of the Volta Region. Yewe is a very exclusive cult and its music is one of the most developed forms of sacred music in Eweland.

Education

A key aspect of the Ewe culture is a philosophy about how to interpret and educate oneself through life's events. The Ewe traditionally pass on generational wisdom through proverbs, many of which aim to contextualize the cultural reverence of life-long education. The traditional Ewe proverb which states "knowledge is like the Baobab Tree and no one can wrap the hands fully around it" exemplifies a profound appreciation of continual self-betterment, even if such a process will never realistically conclude within a natural lifetime.

In the post-colonial era, the Ewe people have become renown among Africans for their pursuit of academia and higher education. Many Ewe people travel across the world to pursue their education at leading institutions following the aforementioned cultural motivations of enhance one's own knowledge base, but also their own status among other Ewe's through doing so. Of those who pursue higher education many Ewe people attain graduate degrees in technical fields such as finance, engineering and law.

Language

Ewe, also written Evhe, or Eʋe, is a major dialect cluster of Gbe or Tadoid (Capo 1991, Duthie 1996) spoken in the southern parts of the Volta Region, in Ghana and across southern Togo, to the Togo-Benin border by about three million people. Ewe belongs to the Gbe family of Niger-Congo. Gbe languages are spoken in an area that extends predominantly from Togo, Benin and as far as Western Nigeria to Lower Weme.

Ewe dialects vary. Groups of villages that are two or three kilometres apart use distinct varieties. Nevertheless, across the Ewe-speaking area, the dialects may be broadly grouped geographically into coastal or southern dialects, e.g., Aŋlɔ, Tɔŋú Avenor, Watsyi and inland dialects characterised indigenously as Ewedomegbe, e.g., Lomé, Danyi, and Kpele etc. (Agbodeka 1997, Gavua 2000, Ansre 2000). Speakers from different localities understand each other and can identify the peculiarities of the different areas. Additionally, there is a written standard that was developed in the nineteenth century based on the regional variants of the various sub-dialects with a high degree of coastal content. With it, a standard colloquial variety has also emerged (spoken usually with a local accent), and is used very widely in cross-dialectal contact sites such as schools, markets, and churches.

The storytellers use a dialect of Aŋlɔ spoken in Seva. Their language is the spoken form and hence does not necessarily conform to the expectations of someone familiar with the standard dialect. For instance, they use the form yi to introduce relative clauses instead of the standard written si, and yia 'this' instead of the standard written sia. They sometimes also use subject markers on the verb agreeing with the lexical NP subject while this is not written in the standard. A distinctive feature of the Aŋlɔ dialect is that the sounds made in the area of the teeth ridge are palatalised when followed by a high vowel. For instance, the verb tsi 'become old' is pronounced "" by the storyteller Kwakuga Goka.

Ewe diaspora
As the Ewe demographic is a sparse but contributing population in West Africa, there have been organizations such as CEANA and Central Ewe Association of North America which aim to fund and initiate development projects and schools in Eweland, comprising Ghana, Benin, and Togo.

Related ethnic groups
Closely related:
Gbe (Tadoid) languages-Adja, Fon, Mahi, Phera, Gun, Gen,

Adja is the original tribe of which the rest -except Gen- descended from. 

Remotely related:
Yoruba, Ga-Dangme

Notable Ewe

Sylvanus Olympio - First President of Republic of Togo

 Jerry John Rawlings - Former President of Ghana

 Emmanuel Kwasi Kotoka - Member of NLC after whom Ghana's Accra International Airport was named

Joseph Kokou Koffigoh - Former Prime Minister of Togo

Edem Kodjo - Former Secretary General - Organisation of African Unity now Africa Union.

Nicephore Soglo - Former President of Benin

Komla Agbeli Gbedemah - Former Finance Minister of Ghana under Kwame Nkrumah

John Willie Kofi Harlley - Former IGP under Kwame Nkrumah, Deputy chairman of NLC 

Anthony Deku - Former IGP, Member of NLC

Bella Bellow - Togolese world acclaimed Musician. Composer of Blewu song performed by Angelique Kidjo when Donald Trump visited France in 2018.

Willie Klutse - Ex- Ghanaian international footballer. Member of 1978 Blackstars Afcon winning team

Esther Ocloo - First Ghanaian female industrialist

Philip Gbeho - Musician and Composer of Ghana's national anthem

Ephraim Amu - Musician and composer of traditional African music.  Composer of the popular Ghanaian patriotic song ‘Yen yera asase ni’( miade nyigba lorlor la) 

Fred Kwasi Apaloo - Former Chief Justice of Ghana. Former Chief Justice of Kenya

Professor Kofi Awoonor - Poet,author, academic and diplomat. Former Ghana’s permanent representative to the United Nations

Annie Ruth Jiagge - Lawyer, judge and women’s right activist. First woman judge of Ghana and the Commonwealth of Nations

Isaac Dogboe - Boxer, Former WBO junior featherweight holder

Joseph Agbeko - Boxer, Former IBF and IBO bantamweight title holder
Sefadzi Abena Amesu (S3fa), Ghanaian afrobeats / afro pop musician 

Alex Casimir Dosseh -  Composer of the Togolese national anthem

Marie Thérèse Metoyer, Businesswoman

Edward Doe Adjaho -  Former Speaker of Ghana Parliament

 Junior Agogo  Former Ghanaian Blackstars player who played in the English premier league 
 
 Cody Gakpo. Dutch national team football player.
 Alex Agbo
 Fofo Agbo
 Jerome Agbo
 Alexander Djiku
 Kossi Agassa
 Dosseh Attivi
 Patrick Attipoe -  World War II veteran who in a bid to present a petition to the British colonial authority in Accra was killed with two others by Major Immray. This led to the Accra riots and expedited the independence of Ghana
 Abu Ogogo
 Emmanuel Hackman
MzVee
M.anifest
E.L.
Stonebwoy
Feli Nuna
 Gale Agbossoumonde
 Pascal Simpson
Ernest Hudson Jr. (ancestral)
 Edward Kpodo
 Prince Kpodo
 Steven Nador
 Yorgan Agblemagnon
 Liyabé Kpatoumbi
 Serge Gakpé
 Dosseh Attivi
 Emanuel Emegha
 [Francis Amuzu] professional footballer
 [Ferdie Ato Adoboe] Guinness world record holder for running backwards and also speed juggling
Christian Atsu, was a professional footballer

See also
 Ewe music
 Ewe drumming
 Anlo Ewe
 Avenor Ewe
 Agbadza

References

Further reading
 The Ewe People, Jakob Spieth (1906), A German Togo colony record
 Ewe (Heritage Library of African Peoples) by E. Ofori Akyea
 A handbook of Eweland: Volume I, edited by Francis Agbodeka
 A Handbook of Eweland: Volume II, edited by Kodzo Gavua
 The Ewe of Togo and Benin, A handbook of Eweland Volume III
 Eʋe Dukɔ ƒe Blemanyawo, Eŋlɔla: Charles Kɔmi Kudzɔdzi (Papavi Hogbedetɔ)
 African Rhythm: A Northern Ewe Perspective by Kofi Agawu
 Gahu: Traditional Social Music of the Ewe People
 Kpegisu: A War Drum of the Ewe by Godwin Agbeli
 Gahu: Traditional Social Music of Ewe People
 Amegbetɔa alo Agbezuge ƒe ŋutinya

External links

 — Traditional Ewe stories retold, in English

 
Ethnic groups in Togo
Ethnic groups in Benin
Ethnic groups in Ghana
West African people